Kim In-Sub (born March 2, 1973, in Daegu, South Korea) is a retired Korean Greco Roman wrestler. He won two gold medals and one silver medal at the 1998, 1999 and 2001 FILA Wrestling World Championships.

In the 2000 Summer Olympics in Sydney, Australia, Kim earned a silver medal.  He also competed at the 2004 Athens Olympics, but did not win a medal.

References

Olympic wrestlers of South Korea
Wrestlers at the 2000 Summer Olympics
South Korean male sport wrestlers
Wrestlers at the 2004 Summer Olympics
1973 births
Living people
Olympic medalists in wrestling
Asian Games medalists in wrestling
Wrestlers at the 1998 Asian Games
Wrestlers at the 2002 Asian Games
World Wrestling Championships medalists
Medalists at the 2000 Summer Olympics
Olympic silver medalists for South Korea
Sportspeople from Daegu
Asian Games gold medalists for South Korea
Medalists at the 1998 Asian Games
Medalists at the 2002 Asian Games
20th-century South Korean people
21st-century South Korean people